Der Bozz ("The bozz") is the third album by German rapper Azad and also the first release for his label Bozz-Music. The album was released on July 5, 2004. In Germany, the album reached the top 10 of the album-charts.

Track listing

Original 
"Intro" - 0:38
"Der Bozz" - 3:35
"Flieh" - 3:48
"Mein Block"
"Toni El Shout"
"Phoenix"
"Peiniger"
"Judgement Day" (featuring Warheit)
"Reflektionen (In meinen Augen)"
"Blackout"
"Skit"
"Kopf hoch" (featuring Jonesmann) - 4:02
"Zahltag" - 3:42
"Outro" - 0:14

References

2004 albums
Azad (rapper) albums